Céilí's Muse was a Celtic folk band active in Houston, Texas from 1989 until 1997. Formed by Maggie Drennon (then named Stephanie Bingham) on vocals, flute and bodhrán and Mary Maddux on vocals and guitar, the duo performed a combination of traditional and contemporary Irish and Scottish folk songs at local festivals and venues like Houston's Red Lion Pub and later McGonigel's Mucky Duck Pub. Their first album was a limited release cassette, One Voice in 1991. At the CD release performance for their second album, Circles of Stone in 1993 at the Mucky Duck, Maggie saw Chuck Ivy enter the room and called from the stage "You know something about sound. Fix it!" thus enlisting him as their sound engineer for the next year.

Melanie O'Sullivan joined as a singer in January 1994 and Chuck moved from behind the sound board onto the stage as bass guitar and Chapman Stick player in October of the same year for the recording of the group's third album Céilí's Muse Live: Muse Secret #73.

In the summer of 1995 Mary moved to New England leaving the group searching for a guitarist. A temporary replacement was found in local musician/songwriter, Leora Salo, who played with Céilí's Muse on the Houston Celtic live festival recording Blarney Fest '95, an album also featuring Houston's Flying Fish Sailors and Clandestine, locally, and opening with the band for the Cranberries. Leora's time in the band was brief, however, so again they recruited from their support staff, this time pulling in their live albums' engineer Anders Johansson to add acoustic and electric guitars to the mix. An album with this lineup was released in late 1995 as The Dark Lady and the band toured the Midwest and the East Coast as well as the North Texas Irish Festival. This lineup also performed at and recorded another festival the next year, Son of Blarneyfest, again with the Flying Fish Sailors and introducing another local Celtic group, Gordian Knot. Mary Maddux also returned to perform a few songs solo for this show.

Between the fall of 1996 and spring of 1997, the band reorganized yet again with Melanie leaving the group and Mike Byers joining on guitar, bouzouki, and mandolin. Wolf Loescher of Austin's "Two O'Clock Courage" also sat in on percussion for numerous gigs during the Spring and Summer of 1997. Chuck left the group in 1997 and the group performed a few more shows as Céilí's Muse after he left, but ultimately disbanded, with some members regrouping as SixMileBridge the next year. Still, Céilí's Muse was nominated for Houston Press music award for Best Ethnic Music some 18 months after the band officially broke up. They lost out to The Gypsies who were actually still performing at the time.
 Circles of Stone
 1. Crazy Man Michael 3:20
 2. Ca the Yowes To the Knowes 2:48
 3. The Queen of Argyll 2:11
 4. The Tinkerman's Daughter 3:32
 5. My Lagan Love 3:41
 6. The Green Fields of France 5:01
 7. All That You Ask Me 3:26
 8. Johnny Jump Up 3:17
 9. The Winter Is Past 2:34
 10. The Lea Rig 4:02
 11. Red Haired Mary 2:59
 12. Ae Fond Kiss 3:20
 13. Mothers, Daughters, Wives 3:45
 14. What You Do With What You've Got 2:02
Muse Secret #73 - 1994 

 Joy of My Heart 
 Leaves in the Wind 
 Carraigdhoun 
 Johnny I Hardly Knew Ye 
 The Scotsman 
 With Her Head Tucked Underneath Her Arm 
 All Around My Hat 
 She Moved Through the Fair 
 Song for Ireland 
 Cockles and Mussels (Molly Malone) 
 Nobody's Moggy Now 
 Lily the Pink 

The Dark Lady - 1995

 Korelia's Song
 Ashfields and Brine (feat. George Furey)
 The Dark Lady
 Wild Geese
 Don't Get Married, Girls
 The Galway Farmer
 Heroes (feat. George Furey)
 Anywhere
 Arthur McBride
 Crow on the Cradle
 Donegal Diamond
 Twiddley-Aye

External links
 http://www.loosegoose.com/muse/

Celtic music groups